The Battle of Agridi was fought on 15 June 1232 between the forces loyal to Henry I of Cyprus (such as those of the Ibelin family) and the imperial army of Frederick II, composed mostly of men from Lombardy. It resulted in an Ibelin victory and the successful relief of the siege of Dieudamour, an Ibelin castle on Cyprus.

Frederick II, as regent for his young son Conrad II of Jerusalem, appointed five bailiffs to govern Cyprus much to the displeasure of the local nobility. This was greatly opposed by the Ibelin family and they, supported by the government of the king of Cyprus (a feudatory of Jerusalem) and of Jerusalem, made war on the five bailiffs. Initially successful in controlling the chief fortresses of the island, in the first half of 1232, one of the bailiffs, Aimery Barlais, conquered most of Cyprus save Dieudamour and Buffavento for the emperor. The Ibelins responded by trying to bribe the Genoese into an alliance with them by offering them commercial privileges at Cypriot ports as well as land grants. This failed, however.

The Ibelins and Cypriots assembled a meagre force of 233 mounted men as opposed to the massive Lombard force of 2,000 horse. Their army was divided into five battles. Four were lined up under the command of Hugh of Ibelin, Anceau of Brie, Baldwin of Ibelin, and John of Caesarea. Balian of Beirut, though he was supposed to be with the rearguard, lined up at the front beside Hugh and Anceau. The rearguard was commanded by John I of Beirut and Henry of Cyprus.

The Lombard vanguard was led by Walter of Manepeau, who charged as far as the Ibelin rearguard beforing turning around and leading his men at the fourth battle under John of Caesarea. They were repulsed and fled. The second Lombard battle made a successful charge at the force under Hugh's command, but the men of Anceau readily came to his rescue. After this, "battle subsequently developed as a series of confused individual combats, in which some great feats of arms were performed. . . . though carried out from a position of complete order, [the charge] had merely been the prelude to an untidy mêlée."

During the mêlée, Berart of Manepeau was dismounted by Anceau of Brie and seventeen comrades who dismounted to help him were killed by sergeants on foot before he recovered. The young Balian gained a reputation defending a pass from the Lombards. In the end, the arrival of between 50 and 60 sergans à pié (foot sergeants) from the town of Agridi was critical to their success. According to L'Estoire de Eracles empereur et la conqueste de la terre de Outremer:
". . . une chose y ot, qui aida moult a Chypreis: ce que il avoient sergens a pié; dont il avenoit que, quant un de lor chevaliers estoit abatus, que li sergent le relevoient, et le remetoient a cheval. Et quant un des autres estoit abatus, piestant l'ocioient li sergent et prenoient . . ."
. . . there was one thing which greatly helped the Cypriots: they had foot sergeants, which meant that when one of their knights was knocked down, the sergeants helped him up and remounted him on a horse. And when one of the Lombards was struck down, he was either killed or captured by the foot sergeants.

Following the battle, John of Beirut, with funds from Henry of Cyprus, hired thirteen Genoese galleys to aid in the siege of Kyrenia.

References 
 Marshall, Christopher. Warfare in the Latin East, 1192–1291. Cambridge University Press, 1992.
 Lamonte, John L. "The Lords of Caesarea in the Period of the Crusades." Speculum, Vol. 22, No. 2. (Apr., 1947), pp 145–161.

Notes 

Battles of the Crusades
Conflicts in 1232
Agridi
Battles involving the Republic of Genoa
Battles involving the Holy Roman Empire
Battle of Agridi
Battle of Agridi
Battle of Agridi
Battle of Agridi
Frederick II, Holy Roman Emperor